Alfonso of Brienne, called Alphonse d'Acre  (c. 1228 – 14 September 1270), was the son of John of Brienne and Berengaria of León, born in Acre.

Alfonso took part in the Seventh Crusade (1248) as a squire. By his marriage (before 1250) to Marie, Countess of Eu he became Count of Eu. He was also Grand Chamberlain of France. He died on 14 September 1270 in Tunis on the Eighth Crusade in the same epidemic that claimed King Louis IX.

He had at least two children by Marie:
John I of Brienne, Count of Eu
Blanche (d. bef. 1338), Abbess of Maubuisson

Ancestry

References

Sources

1228 births
1270 deaths
People from Acre, Israel
Counts of Eu
Christians of the Seventh Crusade
Christians of the Eighth Crusade
House of Brienne
Burials at the Basilica of Saint-Denis
Sons of emperors